ATP-dependent RNA helicase DDX39 is an enzyme that in humans is encoded by the DDX39 gene.

This gene encodes a member of the DEAD box protein family. These proteins are characterized by the conserved motif Asp-Glu-Ala-Asp (DEAD) and are putative RNA helicases. They are implicated in a number of cellular processes involving alteration of RNA secondary structure, such as translation initiation, nuclear and mitochondrial splicing, and ribosome and spliceosome assembly. Based on their distribution patterns, some members of the DEAD box protein family are believed to be involved in embryogenesis, spermatogenesis, and cellular growth and division.

References

Further reading

External links